Swastika Lake is a lake in Albany County, Wyoming, in the United States. The lake is located in the Medicine Bow – Routt National Forest near the Libby Creek hiking trail.

References

Lakes of Wyoming
Lakes of Albany County, Wyoming